Moritz, Dear Moritz is a 1978 West German drama film directed by Hark Bohm. It was entered into the 28th Berlin International Film Festival.

Cast
 Michael Kebschull as Moritz Stuckmann
 Kyra Mladeck as Mother Stuckmann
 Walter Klosterfelde as Dad Stuckmann
 Elvira Thom as Aunt
 Kerstin Wehlmann as Barbara
 Uwe Bohm as Uwe (as Uwe Enkelmann)
 Dschingis Bowakow as Dschingis
 Grete Mosheim as Grandmother
 Uwe Dallmeier as cantor
 Marquard Bohm as Barbara's father
 Hark Bohm as doctor
 Armand Hacaturyan as bassist
 Nico Lafrenz as drummer
 Richard Schumacher as guitar player
 Eva Fiebig as widow
 Christa Siems as caretaker

References

External links

1978 films
1978 drama films
German coming-of-age drama films
West German films
1970s German-language films
Films directed by Hark Bohm
Films scored by Klaus Doldinger
Films set in Hamburg
1970s coming-of-age drama films
1970s German films